Harold Rhodes is the name of:

 Harold Rhodes (inventor) (1910–2000), inventor of the Army Air Corps Piano, the Pre-piano and the Rhodes piano
 Harold Rhodes (cricketer) (born 1936), English former cricketer
 Harold Winston Rhodes (1905–1987), New Zealand university professor of English

See also
 Harold Rhode (born 1949), American Middle East specialist